These are the Billboard magazine R&B albums to reach number-one in 1981.

Chart history

See also
1981 in music
R&B number-one hits of 1981 (USA)

1981